Oriel Sea Salt is a variety of Irish sea salt.

History
Oriel Sea Salt was established at Port Oriel, Clogherhead in 2010 by Brian Fitzpatrick and John Delany. It extracts and harvests salt and minerals from Irish Sea seawater.

It describes itself as "the only non-oxidised sea salt on the planet": the seawater is pumped from the seabed without being exposed to air, resulting in a naturally white salt with a fine powdery grain and a "smooth depth of flavour." 

They received Protected designation of origin in 2016.

See also
 Irish cuisine
Oriel Sea Minerals
 List of Republic of Ireland food and drink products with protected status

References

Irish products with protected designation of origin
Irish cuisine
Edible salt